National Resistance may refer to:
Any resistance movement that seeks the "liberation" of territory from perceived foreign occupation
Resistance during World War II in particular
French resistance
Greek resistance
Yemeni National Resistance
 National Resistance (El Salvador)

See also

National Resistance Front (disambiguation)